The 1894 Birthday Honours were appointments by Queen Victoria to various orders and honours to reward and highlight good works by citizens of the British Empire. The appointments were made to celebrate the official birthday of The Queen, and were published in the London Gazette on 25 May 1894. and in The Times on 26 May 1894.

The recipients of honours are displayed here as they were styled before their new honour, and arranged by honour, with classes (Knight, Knight Grand Cross, etc.) and then divisions (Military, Civil, etc.) as appropriate.

United Kingdom and British Empire

Privy Councillor
The Queen appointed the following to Her Majesty's Most Honourable Privy Council:
Jacob Bright 
Sir Arthur Hayter

Baronetcies
James Reckitt.
Weetman Dickinson Pearson
Thomas Glen-Coats
Samuel Montagu 
John Austin

Knight Bachelor
Dr. John Charles Bucknill, one of the originators of the National Volunteer Force in 1852.
Louis-Napoléon Casault, Senior Puisne Judge of the Superior Court of the Province of Quebec, in the Dominion of Canada.
John Joseph Grinlinton, Member of the Legislative Council of the Island of Ceylon, Commissioner for that island at the recent Exhibition at Chicago.
Francis Seymour Haden, President of the Royal Society of Painter Etchers.
John Hutton, Chairman of the London County Council.
Philip Manfield  for Northampton.
Jerom Murch, of Bath.
Isaac Pitman, the originator of Pitman's system of shorthand.
Thomas Wemyss Reid.
The Hon. Arthur Renwick  Commissioner for New South Wales at the recent Exhibition at Chicago, formerly Minister of Mines, Minister of Public Instruction, and now Member of the Legislative Council of that colony.
James Alexander Russell, Lord Provost of Edinburgh.
Thomas Robinson  for Gloucester.
The Hon. Frank Smith, Senator and Member of the Government of the Dominion of Canada.
Dr. Thomas Grainger Stewart, Physician in Ordinary to the Queen in Scotland and Professor of Physic in the University of Edinburgh.
Richard Tangye, of Birmingham.
Thomas Thornton, Town Clerk of Dundee.
George Williams, founder of the Young Men's Christian Association.

The Most Honourable Order of the Bath

Knight Grand Cross of the Order of the Bath (GCB)

Military Division
General Sir Robert Onesiphorus Bright 
General Sir Robert Phayre  Indian Staff Corps.
Honorary Major General Sir Charles Henry Palliser  retired full pay, late Indian Staff Corps.
General Sir Charles George Arbuthnot  Royal Artillery.
Lieutenant-General the Rt. Hon. Sir Redvers Henry Buller  Adjutant-General to the Forces.

Knight Commander of the Order of the Bath (KCB)
Military Division
General James Frankfort Manners Browne  Royal Engineers.
Surgeon-General James Mouat  late Army Medical Department, Honorary Surgeon to the Queen.
Honorary Major-General James Mansfield Nuttall  retired full pay, late Indian Staff Corps.
General James Abbott  Royal (late Bengal) Artillery. 
General Robert Cadell  Royal (late Madras) Artillery. 
General Henry Hastings Affleck Wood  Indian Staff Corps.
Major-General Frederick William Edward Forestier-Walker  Commanding the Force in Egypt.
Lieutenant-General Edward Newdigate Newdegate  
Lieutenant-General Henry Brackenbury  Royal Artillery, Ordinary Member of the Council of the Governor-General of India.
Honorary Major-General Robert John Hughes 
Rear-Admiral John Arbuthnot Fisher  Controller of the Navy. 
Colonel William Green 
Lieutenant-General Robert John Hay  Royal Artillery, Director of Artillery.

Civil Division
Edward Walter Hamilton  Assistant Secretary to the Treasury.
Augustus Wollaston Franks  Keeper, Department of British and Mediaeval Antiquities and Ethnography, British Museum.

Companion of the Order of the Bath (CB)
Military Division
Deputy Surgeon-General William George Nicholas Manley  late Army Medical Department.
Colonel Edward Lutwyche England.
Lieutenant-Colonel and Colonel Horace Moule Evans, Indian Staff Corps.
Lieutenant-Colonel and Colonel Francis James Caldecott, Royal (late Bombay) Artillery, Indian Ordnance Department.
Lieutenant-Colonel and Colonel Francis Eddowes Hastings, Indian Army.
Lieutenant-Colonel and Colonel Charles McInroy, Indian Staff Corps.
Lieutenant-Colonel and Colonel Francis William Ward, Royal (late Bengal) Artillery, Colonel on Staff (for Royal Artillery), Bengal.
Colonel John Jopp, Indian Staff Corps, Commanding a Second Class District in India.
Colonel (temporary Major-General) Hugh Thomas Jones-Vaughan, Colonel on the Staff Commanding the Troops in the Straits Settlements.
Lieutenant-Colonel and Brevet Colonel  Edmund Henry Eyre, Indian Staff Corps, Quartermaster-General, Madras.
Colonel William Freeman Kelly.
Colonel Charles More Stockley, Regimental District.
Lieutenant-Colonel and Colonel the Hon. George Hugh Gough, 14th Hussars.
Lieutenant-Colonel and Brevet Colonel John Henry Barnard  Aide-de-Camp to the Queen.
Lieutenant-Colonel and Brevet Colonel Thomas Hungerford Holdich, Royal Engineers.
Colonel Edward Thomas Henry Hutton, Aide-de-Camp to the Queen, Commandant Colonial Forces, New South Wales.
Veterinary Lieutenant-Colonel William B. Walters, late Army Veterinary Department.
Lieutenant-Colonel Archibald Broadfoot, Royal Artillery.

The following appointments to the Most Honourable Order of the Bath given in recognition of the services in the recent operations against Fodey Silah in Combo on the Gambia:
Major and Brevet Lieutenant-Colonel Arthur Domville Corbet, Royal Marine Light Infantry.
Fleet Surgeon William Rogerson White.

Civil Division
Richard Davis Awdry, Assistant Secretary to the Admiralty.
The Hon. Hamilton John Agmondesham Cuffe, Assistant Solicitor to the Treasury.
Frederic Fitzjames Cullinan, Principal Clerk in the Chief Secretary's Office, Dublin Castle.
Daniel Robert Fearon, Secretary to the Charity Commissioners.
Sir George Grove  Director of the Royal College of Music.
Andrew Charles Howard, Assistant Commissioner of Metropolitan Police.
Colonel Herbert Locock, Royal Engineers, Deputy Inspector-General of Fortifications, War Office.
Alfred Milner, Chairman of the Board of Inland Revenue.
Walter Murton, Solicitor to the Board of Trade.
Edmund Constantine Henry Phipps, a Minister Plenipotentiary in Her Majesty's Diplomatic Service, Secretary to Her Majesty's Embassy at Paris.
The Reverend Thomas Wetherhead Sharpe, Senior Chief Inspector of Schools, Education Department.

The Most Exalted Order of the Star of India

Knight Commander (KCSI)
Major General Oliver Richardson Newmarch  Military Secretary at the India Office.

Companion (CSI)

Major-General Robert Charles Boileau Pemberton, Royal Engineers.
Arthur Charles Trevor, Indian Civil Service, Member of Council, Bombay.

The Most Distinguished Order of Saint Michael and Saint George

Knight Grand Cross of the Order of St Michael and St George (GCMG)
The Hon. Sir Henry Ayers  five times Premier of South Australia, and subsequently for many years President of the Legislative Council of that Colony.

Knight Commander of the Order of St Michael and St George (KCMG)
Lieutenant-General Arthur James Lyon Fremantle  Governor and Commander-in-Chief of the Island of Malta.
The Hon. James Brown Patterson, Premier and Chief Secretary of the Colony of Victoria.
The Hon. John Lackey, President of the Legislative Council of the Colony of New South Wales.
George Thomas Michael O'Brien  Colonial Secretary of the Colony of Hong Kong.
Edwyn Sandys Dawes, for services in connection with the Colony of Queensland, and in developing steam communication between England and certain of Her Majesty's Colonial Possessions.

Honorary Knight Commander
William Cornelius Van Horne, President of the Canadian Pacific Railway Company.

Companion of the Order of St Michael and St George (CMG)
Charles-Eugène Boucher de Boucherville, Senator of the Dominion of Canada.
Colonel Frederick Cardew, now Administering the Government of the Colony of Sierra Leone, and lately Acting Resident Commissioner in Zululand.
Charles Bletterman Elliott  General Manager of Railways of the Cape of Good Hope.
Capt. Hamilton John Goold-Adams, Commandant of the British Bechuanaland Border Police.
Robert Grieve  Surgeon-General of the Colony of British Guiana.
Emanuel Charles Poupinel de Valencé, President of the Royal Society of Arts and Sciences of Mauritius, and Vice-President of the General Board of Health in that Colony.

The Most Eminent Order of the Indian Empire

Companion (CIE)
Colonel Thomas Hungerford Holdich, Royal Engineers, Superintendent, Survey Department.
His Highness Mir Hasan Ali Khan.
Colonel Frank William Chatterton, Commandant Administrative Battalion, Calcutta Volunteers, and Honorary Aide-de-Camp to the Viceroy of India.
George Abraham Grierson, Indian Civil Service.
Francis Joseph Edward Spring, Joint Secretary to Government, Public Works Department, Railway Branch, Bombay.
Edwin Welsh Kellner, Accountant-General, Punjab.
Major Ivar Macivor, Indian Staff Corps 
Cowasjee Dinshaw, of Aden 
Thomas Blaney, President of the Municipal Corporation, Bombay.
Graham Anderson.
Tikka Raghunath Singh, of Bashahr.
Rao Bahadur Sri Ram Bhikaji Jatar.

Distinguished Service Order (DSO)
Lieutenant and Commander Herbert Goodenough King-Hall  
Surgeon Walter Bowden

References

Birthday Honours
1894 awards
1894 in Australia
1894 in Canada
1894 in India
1894 in the United Kingdom